North Avenue station is an elevated Manila Metro Rail Transit (MRT) station situated on Line 3. Located in Diliman in Quezon City and is named after its location, which is at the corner of Epifanio de los Santos Avenue (EDSA) and North Avenue, it is the current northern terminus of the line.

The North Avenue Depot, an underground depot where the trains of the line are kept and maintained, is located near the station. The elevated tracks terminate abruptly beyond the station, but there is sufficient room for a terminating train to leave the station and stop before switching to the other track then entering the station again to begin the journey south.

Nearby landmarks
The station is directly connected to one of the Philippines' premier shopping malls, TriNoma which opened in 2007. It is also close to SM City North EDSA, one of the Philippine's largest malls. Other nearby landmarks include the Veritas Tower (home of the Veritas 846 studios), SM Cyber West Avenue, Philippine College of Surgeons, UNTV Broadcast Center, and Triangle Park where Veterans Memorial Medical Center, Vertis North, Ayala Malls Vertis North, Philippine Science High School Main Campus, Quezon City Science High School, and Ninoy Aquino Parks & Wildlife Center can be found. Philippine Medical Association secretariat, Phil-Am, and Sogo Hotel North Edsa are also within reach from the station.

Transportation links
North Avenue station is a major hub for buses plying the EDSA route and one of the most crowded MRT-3 stations during rush hour. A bus terminal is also located near the station, particularly at TriNoma and SM City North EDSA, while a bus stop of EDSA Busway, which is accessible through the station, is located at the center island of EDSA beside the station. Taxis, jeepneys, and UV Express vans also stop in and around the bus terminals.

Operating schedule
The line operates from 4:30 AM until 10:00 PM all days a week. It is closed for annual maintenance every Maundy Thursday to Easter Sunday.

First / last train service

Express Train Service

Note: This service was discontinued in 2014.

Gallery

See also
List of rail transit stations in Metro Manila
Manila Metro Rail Transit System Line 3

References

Manila Metro Rail Transit System stations
Railway stations opened in 1999
Buildings and structures in Quezon City
1999 establishments in the Philippines